This is a list of notable alumni and faculty of Drake University.

Notable alumni

Politics and military
Brenna Bird, Iowa Attorney General (2023–)
Robert D. Blue, Governor of Iowa (1945–1949)
Terry Branstad, former Governor of Iowa (1983–1999, 2011–2017) and United States ambassador to China (2017–2020), longest-serving state governor in U.S. history
Bonnie Campbell, lawyer, former Iowa Attorney General (1991–1995) and gubernatorial candidate
Johnnie Carson, career diplomat
Chet Culver, former Governor of Iowa (2007–2011)
Merwin Coad, Iowa Congressman (1957–1963) 
Joe Crail, California Congressman (1927–1933)
Cassius Clay Dowell, Iowa Congressman (1915–1935, 1937–1940)
Guy Gillette, Iowa Congressman (1933–1936) and Senator (1936–1945, 1949–1955)
Robert K. Goodwin, Iowa Congressman (1940–1941)
Adam Gregg, lieutenant governor of Iowa (2019–present)
Abby Finkenauer, former Iowa Congresswoman (2019–2021)
Carl W. Hoffman, U.S. Marine Corps Major general 
Ron Kouchi, President of the Hawaii State Senate
Darrell R. Lindsey, Medal of Honor recipient
Jim Nussle, former Iowa Congressman (1991–2007) and director of the Office of Management and Budget 
Stephen Rapp, former United States Ambassador-at-Large for War Crimes Issues in the Office of Global Criminal Justice 
Robert D. Ray, Governor of Iowa (1969–1983)
Michael H. Rohl, SD State Senator (2020-current), CSG Nationwide 20 under 40 (2022)
David N. Senty, retired U.S. Air Force Major General
Neal Smith, former Iowa Congressman (1959–1995)
Sara Taylor, former Deputy Assistant to the President and Director of Political Affairs in the George W. Bush administration
Hubert Utterback, Iowa Congressman (1935–1937)
David Young, former Iowa Congressman (2015–2019)
Zach Nunn, U.S. Representative-elect from Iowa’s 3rd district (2023–)
Frederick T. Weber, Naval Aviator who died at the Battle of Midway

Law
Mark Cady, lawyer, Chief Justice Supreme Court of Iowa (2011–2019)
Roxanne Conlin, lawyer, former United States Attorney for the Southern District of Iowa (1977–1981), and Iowa senate and gubernatorial candidate
Robert Cowen, senior judge on the United States Court of Appeals for the Third Circuit
George Gardner Fagg, United States federal judge on the United States Court of Appeals for the Eighth Circuit
Cleon H. Foust, Indiana Attorney General (1947–1949)
Joseph C. Howard Sr., Judge, United States District Court for the District of Maryland (1979–2000)
Louis A. Lavorato, lawyer, Chief Justice Supreme Court of Iowa (2000–2006)
Ronald Olson, partner in the Los Angeles office of the law firm of Munger Tolles & Olson LLP
Wendy J. Olson, United States Attorney for the District of Idaho (2010–2017)
Marsha Ternus, lawyer, Chief Justice Supreme Court of Iowa (2006–2010)
Terry Trieweiler, Montana Supreme Court Justice, Montana Lawyer of the Year 
Thomas R. Young, author, lawyer, District Court Judge, District 22A (Iredell and Alexander Counties), North Carolina (2020–Present)

Arts and literature
Joanne Aono, artist
Rose Bampton, principal singer at Metropolitan Opera during 1930s and 1940s
Bruce Brubaker, musician
Bill Bryson, author
Samuel Clemens, journalist
Gwen M. Davidson, artist
Mark Doty, poet
Susan Glaspell, author
Joseph Hermann, conductor, clarinetist and music educator; president of American Bandmasters Association
Syleena Johnson, R&B singer, actress, and reality television personality 
Ira Levin, author of Rosemary's Baby, The Boys from Brazil, The Stepford Wives, Deathtrap
Sherrill Milnes, operatic baritone
Carol Morris, Miss Universe 1956, actress
Dick Oatts, jazz saxophonist
Phil Stong, author of State Fair, novel filmed three times
Matthew Stover, author of fantasy and science fiction, including novelization of Star Wars: Revenge of the Sith
Roger Williams, musician and composer
Bart Yates, author

Entertainment and media
Steve Allen, comedian, actor and first host of The Tonight Show (attended, did not graduate)
Lew Anderson, musician and voice of Clarabell the Clown
John August, screenwriter
Steve Bannos, film actor and writer
Mary Bock, journalist
Joseph Chaikin, founder of the Open Theater, theater director, actor, author
Lee Ann Colacioppo, nee Fleet, editor of The Denver Post
Julee Cruise, singer and actress
Mark DeCarlo, actor, comedian, host of Taste of America television show, cartoon voice actor
Jerry Douglas, writer and director, notably of gay pornographic films
Michael Emerson, two-time Emmy Award-winning actor
Bridget Flanery, actress
Lambert Hillyer, silent film director
Dave Mallow, voice-over artist for television, film, animation, commercials, video games
Kazuki Takahashi, creator of Yu-Gi-Oh! (attended, did not graduate)
Al McCoy, sports broadcaster, voice of the Phoenix Suns
Clark R. Mollenhoff, Pulitzer Prize-winning journalist
Jeremy Piven, three-time Emmy Award-winning actor (attended, did not graduate)
Ray Rizzo, three-time Pokémon Video Game World Champion
Wynn Speece, "Neighbor Lady", WNAX radio station
Jim Uhls, screenwriter, including the script for Fight Club
Sam Wanamaker, actor and director
Larry Whiteside, award-winning sportswriter
Rex Wockner, journalist
David L. Wolper, television and film producer

Business
Archie R. Boe, former Chairman and CEO of the Allstate Corporation; former president of Sears, Roebuck
George A. Cohon, founder of McDonald's Restaurants of Canada Limited and McDonald's in Russia
Kenneth A. Macke, former CEO and Chairman of Dayton Hudson Corporation (since renamed Target Corporation)
John M. Mathew, President and Chief Executive Officer of Wick Communications Company
Dwight D. Opperman, former CEO of West Publishing Company, after whom Drake's law library is named
Fred L. Turner, former Chairman of McDonald's 
Johnny C. Taylor Jr. Present and CEO of Society for Human Resource management

Science and academia
Jon Bowermaster, oceans expert, journalist, filmmaker and adventurer
W. Dean Eastman, award-winning educator
Cuthbert Hurd, computer pioneer
Thomas Kunz, researcher notable for insights into bat ecology
Timothy Ley, hematologist, oncologist and cancer biologist
William A. Staples, president of the University of Houston–Clear Lake
Brian Wansink, Cornell University professor and author of Mindless Eating: Why We Eat More Than We Think
Harley A. Wilhelm, Manhattan Project scientist and co-inventor of the Ames Process for purifying uranium, co-founder of the Ames Laboratory for the U.S. Dept. of Energy

Athletics
Samm “Jelly” Jones, former basketball player at Drake, and Minnesota state HS basketball champion  
Chris Ash, American football coach, former head coach at Rutgers University
Tom Bienemann, former NFL defensive end for the Chicago Cardinals
Johnny Bright, member of the College and Canadian Football Hall of Fame
Waldo Don Carlos, retired NFL center for the Green Bay Packers
Billy Cundiff, NFL placekicker
Keno Davis, Basketball Coach, 2008 Associated Press College Basketball Coach of the Year
Versil Deskin, former NFL player
Dave Doeren, head football coach at  North Carolina State University
Pat Dunsmore, former NFL player
Bill Easton, 3-time winner of NCAA Men's Division I Cross Country Championship as coach at Drake (1944-1946) 
Ezra Hendrickson, professional soccer player and coach
York Hentschel, CFL player and 3 time Grey Cup champion
Maury John, Hall of Fame Basketball Coach: Final Four (1969), and Elite 8 (1970 and 1971)
Zach Johnson, professional golfer, winner of the 2007 Masters and 2015 Open Championship
Karl Kassulke, former NFL player
Wayne Kreklow, retired professional basketball player
Kevin Little, 1997 world indoor champion, 200-meter dash
Lewis Lloyd, retired professional basketball player
John Lynch (radio), former NFL player
Pug Manders, former NFL player
Willie McCarter, former NBA player
McCoy McLemore, former NBA player
Dennis McKnight, former NFL player
Jerry Mertens, former NFL player
Duane Miller, former NFL player, Drake Football record holder
Dick Nesbitt, former NFL player
Bob Netolicky, professional basketball player
Charlie Partridge, American football coach, former head coach at Florida Atlantic University
Mike Samples, former Canadian Football League player
Eric Saubert, professional American football player 
Boris Shlapak, professional football and soccer player for the Baltimore Colts and Chicago Sting respectively
Lee Stange, former MLB pitcher and MLB pitching coach
Bill Stevenson, CFL all-star and record 7 time Grey Cup champion
Ann Swisshelm, two-time Olympic curler
Dan Turk, former NFL player. He transferred after his sophomore season
Rick Wanamaker, winner of the 1971 Pan American Games decathlon
Willie Wise, professional basketball player
Felix Wright, former CFL and NFL safety
Dani Tyler, softball player and 1996 Olympic gold medalist

Notable faculty
 Chester C. Cole, Drake University Law School founder and professor, University of Iowa College of Law co-founder and professor, Chief Justice of the Iowa Supreme Court
George Gallup, Head of Journalism Department (1928-1931)
 Frank Irving Herriott (1868 - 1941), professor of economics (1903-1919), political science and sociology (1903-1941), 
 Jacqui Kalin (born 1989), American-Israeli professional basketball player
 Robert Kibbee (died 1982), Chancellor of the City University of New York
 Edward Mansfield, Iowa Supreme Court justice and adjunct law professor
 Milman Parry, professor of Greek and Latin, 1928-29
 Terri Vaughan, Visiting professor in the College of Business and Public Administration
 Francis Wilhoit, Political Science Professor
 George G. Wright, Iowa Supreme Court justice, Drake University Law School professor, University of Iowa College of Law co-founder, United States Senator from Iowa
 Oleg Zatsarinny, Senior Research Scholar and Lecturer (Atomic Physics)

References

Drake University alumni